A takht, or taḵẖata, literally means a throne or seat of authority and is a spiritual and temporal centre of Sikhism. There are five takhts, which are five gurudwaras that have a very special significance for the Sikh community.

The first and the most important takht was established by Guru Hargobind in 1609: Akal Takht (the Throne of the Timeless God), located just opposite the gate of Harmandir Sahib (The Golden Temple), in Amritsar. While the Harmandir Sahib, or Golden Temple, represents Sikh spiritual guidance, the Akal Takht symbolizes the dispensing of justice and temporal activity. It is the highest seat of temporal authority of the Khalsa and the seat of the Sikh religion's earthly authority. There, the Guru held his court and decided matters of military strategy and political policy. Later on, the Sikh Nation (Sarbat Khalsa) took decisions here on matters of peace and war and settled disputes between the various Sikh groups. The Sarangi singers sung the ballads of the Sikh Gurus and warriors at the place and robes of honour (saropas) were awarded to persons who rendered distinguished services of the community of men in general.

In December 2010, the Deccan Odyssey train, taken on charter from the Government of Maharashtra, started with the aim to have a journey across four Sikh takhts, with a flight by devout and sightseers to the fifth takht (Takht Sri Patna Sahib). A special train for the pilgrimage to the five takhts, named Panj Takht Special Train, began service on 16 February 2014.

Sri Akal Takht Sahib

Akal Takhat Sahib means Eternal Throne. It is also part of the Golden Temple complex in Amritsar. Its foundation was laid by Guru Hargobind Ji, the sixth Sikh Guru. The Akal Takhat is situated opposite to Harmandir Sahib and is connected by a passage. The building of the Akal Takht opposite the Golden Temple has a special meaning. While the Golden Temple stands for spiritual guidance the Akal Takhat symbolizes the dispensing of justice and temporal activity.  In earlier days all Sikh warriors sought blessings here before going to battle fields. During the 18th century while Sikhs were fighting a guerrilla war in the forests they used to gather at the Akal Takht on special occasions such as Vaisakhi. Here the community used to have general meetings and approve resolutions. The Akal Takht is the oldest of the Five Takhats.

Takht Sri Keshgarh Sahib

Takht Sri Keshgarh Sahib is situated at Anandpur Sahib. It is the birthplace of the Khalsa, which was founded here by Guru Gobind Singh in 1699. Some of the weapons of Guru Gobind Singh Ji are displayed here.

Takht Sri Damdama Sahib 

Takht Sri Damdama Sahib (Talwandi Sabo) is situated in the village of Talwandi Sabo near Bathinda. Guru Gobind Singh stayed here for about a year and compiled the final edition of Guru Granth Sahib also known as the Damdama Sahib Bir in 1705. Damdama Sahib was proclaimed the fifth takht on November 18, 1966.

Takht Sri Patna Sahib

Takht Sri Patna Sahib is situated in Patna city which is also the capital of Bihar state. Guru Gobind Singh Ji was born here in 1666 and He spent His early childhood here before moving to Sri Anandpur Sahib. Besides being the birthplace of Guru Gobind Singh Ji, Patna was also visited by Guru Nanak Dev Sahib Ji and Guru Tegh Bahadur Sahib Ji at different points of time. Here also stayed Guru Gobind Singh Ji's mother who is Mata Gujri Ji. In the house of salis rai jaohri.

Takht Sri Hazur Sahib 

Takht Sri Hazur Sahib is situated in Nanded in Maharashtra state. In 1708, Guru Gobind Singh Ji (the tenth spiritual leader of the Sikhs) came to Nanded, His permanent abode. It was he who preached amongst the Sikhs that there need not be any Human Guru for them after Him and they should take Guru Granth Sahib Ji as their living Guru and there will be no difference between Him and the Guru Granth Sahib Ji. A monument has been constructed at the place where Guru Gobind Singh Ji left his body to merge with the omnipresent, known as the Angitha Sahib (funeral pyre). The Takht has been constructed around the Angitha Sahib, and is collectively known as Thakt Sachkand Sri Hazoor Sri Abchal Nagar Sahib.

Others

Takht Sri Budha Dal (Contested) 
According to the Nihangs Budha Dal is the fifth takhat. They state that the Guru proclaimed them the fifth takht and the SGPC removed them as the fifth takht. Although no historical source mentions Budha Dal as a takht.

Gurudwara Janamasthan Nankana Sahib (Potential) 

A proposal for a sixth Sikh takht at Guru Nanak Dev’s birth place in Nankana Sahib in Pakistan has sparked a debate in the Sikh community, and among historians and scholars.

Shiromani Akali Dal (Delhi) president and former president of Delhi Sikh Gurdwara Management Committee (DSMGC) Paramjit Singh Sarna has stirred a controversy by demanding that Gurdwara Janamasthan Nankana Sahib in Pakistan be declared the sixth takht (seat of authority) of Sikhs. Acting jathedar of Akal Takht, Giani Harpreet Singh was the first to censure the demand, saying: “This is a baseless demand which belittles the concept of Panch Pardhani (significance of five) in Sikhism like five articles of faith, five beloved ones (Panj Payaras) and five bania.” The proposal was ignored afterwards.

References

External links
Official Website - HOLY TAKHATS

Gurdwaras
Sikh places